Milagros ("miracles" in Spanish) may refer to:

Milagros, Masbate, Philippines, a first-class municipality
Milagros, Province of Burgos, a municipality in Castile and León, Spain.
Milagros (given name)
Fernando Milagros (born 1980), Chilean pop rock singer and songwriter
Milagros (album), a 2001 studio album by American singer Myra
Milagros (film), a 1997 film
Milagros (telenovela), a 2001 Peruvian telenovela
Milagros: Girl from Away, a 2008 book by Meg Medina

See also
Acueducto de los Milagros, an ancient Roman aqueduct bridge in Spain
Milagro (disambiguation)